Northeast Bolivian Airways (NEBA) was an airline based in Cochabamba, Bolivia from 1970 to 2006.

References

External links
 (offline)
Northeast Bolivian Airways Fleet

Defunct airlines of Bolivia
Airlines established in 1970
Airlines disestablished in 2006
2006 disestablishments in Bolivia
Bolivian companies established in 1970
Cochabamba